Leon Friedman (born February 6, 1933) is an American legal scholar and Joseph Kushner Distinguished Professor of Civil Liberties Law at Hofstra University.

References

Living people
American legal scholars
Hofstra University faculty
1933 births
Harvard Law School alumni
Harvard College alumni